Saint Vincent and the Grenadines competed at the 2014 Summer Youth Olympics, in Nanjing, China from 16 August to 28 August 2014.

Athletics

Saint Vincent and the Grenadines qualified one athlete.

Qualification Legend: Q=Final A (medal); qB=Final B (non-medal); qC=Final C (non-medal); qD=Final D (non-medal); qE=Final E (non-medal)

Girls
Track & road events

Beach Volleyball

St. Vincent and the Grenadines qualified a boys' team by winning the NORCECA ECVA Zone Qualifier.

Swimming

St. Vincent and the Grenadines qualified one swimmer.

Girls

References

2014 in Saint Vincent and the Grenadines
Nations at the 2014 Summer Youth Olympics
Saint Vincent and the Grenadines at the Youth Olympics